This is a list of rulers who converted to Christianity. The conversion of monarchs was often an important step in the process of Christianization.

1st century 

 Abgar V, King of Osroene with his capital at Edessa, c. 1st century

4th century 

 Tiridates III of Armenia, King of Armenia, in 301
 Ezana of Axum, King of Aksum
 Constantine I, Roman emperor, in 337
 Mirian III of Iberia, King of Iberia, c. 337

5th century 
 Óengus mac Nad Froích, King of Munster
 Clovis I, King of the Franks, circa 496-506
 Rechiar, King of the Suebi

6th century 
 Constantine of Dumnonia
 Saint Constantine of Strathclyde
 Rædwald of East Anglia
 Reccared I, king of visigoths, and Hermenegild, sub-king in Baetica, converted from Arianism to the Nicene faith.

7th century 
 Æthelberht of Kent before 601 (see Gregorian mission)
 Cenwalh of Wessex
 Cynegils of Wessex
 Sigeberht of East Anglia
 Riderch I of Alt Clut
 Peada of Mercia
 Edwin of Northumbria

9th century 
 Boris I of Bulgaria (864)
 Guthrum (878)
 Borivoj I, Duke of Bohemia (883)
 Rorik of Dorestad
 Harald Klak

10th century 
Mieszko I of Poland (966)
Géza, Grand Prince of the Hungarians (970s)
 Vladimir I of Kiev (980s)
 Harald Bluetooth of Denmark and Norway
 Eric the Victorious 
 Haakon the Good

11th century 
Olof Skötkonung, King of Sweden (1008)

14th century 
 Jogaila, Grand Duke of Lithuania and King of Poland (1386)

16th century 
 Nzinga of Ndongo and Matamba
 Afonso I of Kongo
 Humabon, Rajah of Cebu (1521)
 Bunao Lakan Dula, Lakan of Tondo (c. 1571)
 Rajah Matanda of Maynila (1572)
 Ōtomo Sōrin (although not a direct royalty, Japanese daimyo were de facto independent rulers of their territories) 
 Arima Harunobu
 Ōmura Sumitada

19th century 
 Hone Heke
 Keopuolani
 Ka'ahumanu
 Kamehameha III
 Tāmati Wāka Nene
 Ranavalona II of Madagascar
 Pomare II
 Duleep Singh

References

 Rulers